James Meehan (1774 – 21 April 1826) was an Irish Australian explorer and surveyor.

Meehan was born in Ireland, in Shinrone, County Offaly, in 1774. He was declared a rebel and given a life sentence in a trial after the Rebellion of 1798  and was one of a number of political prisoners who arrived in Australia on the Friendship in February 1800. He came under the assumed name James Mahon.  Two months later he became an assistant to Charles Grimes, the surveyor-general, and went with him to explore the Hunter River in 1801. He was also with Grimes on the expedition to explore King Island and Port Phillip in the summer of 1802–3. Grimes had a leave of absence from August 1803 to go to England, and during his absence for about three years, Meehan did much of his work with the title of assistant-surveyor. On Grimes' return in 1806 and in appreciation for his work, he was given a pardon for his political crimes. In October 1805, Governor King directed him to trace the course of the Nepean to the southward a little beyond Mount Taurus, and in October 1807 Meehan prepared his plan of Sydney.

In 1812, Governor Macquarie sent him to Tasmania with instructions to remeasure the whole of the farms granted by former governors and himself. He accompanied Hamilton Hume in some explorations in southern New South Wales in 1816, when Lake George was discovered, and in 1818 Meehan was appointed deputy surveyor-general. It was around this time that he named the settlement of Goulburn after Henry Goulburn, the Under-Secretary for War and the Colonies.

He endeavoured in this year without success to find a practicable road over the Shoalhaven River so that communication might be opened up with Jervis Bay, but continuing his efforts early in 1820 he went through some very difficult country after crossing the river from the east, and then connecting with his 1818 track.

In 1822, he resigned his position and was granted a pension of £100 a year in 1823. He died on 21 April 1826. He was a most capable and industrious official, and though he does not rank among the leading explorers, he did some very valuable work while carrying out his duties during the first 20 years of the nineteenth century.

He was a leader of the Catholic Church in Sydney, chairing the meeting in 1820 which began the raising of funds for a church. He was largely responsible for choosing the site, on which St Mary's Cathedral now stands.

Legacy 
 James Meehan Reserve in Dee Why, New South Wales is named after Meehan for his role in surveying the Northern Beaches area and giving Dee Why its name.
 James Meehan High School is named to commemorate Meehan's role in mapping and opening up the Macquarie Fields, New South Wales area.
 A statue of Meehan was placed in a niche on the Loftus Street facade of the Department of Lands building in November 2010.
 James Meehan Street, a road in Windsor
 James Meehan Way, a road in Macquarie Links

See also 
 List of convicts transported to Australia

References

Further reading

 

1774 births
1826 deaths
Explorers of Australia
Australian surveyors
Irish surveyors
Convicts transported to Australia
Australian Roman Catholics